Nikpai may refer to:

Negübei, the khan of the Chagatai Mongols from 1270-1272 AD
Nikpai tribe, a tribe of the Hazara people of Afghanistan